Nancy Curlee is an American soap opera writer. She was head writer of Guiding Light from 1990 to 1994. Her time at the helm of GL is often considered a golden period for the show.

Curlee is married to fellow soap opera writer Stephen Demorest. She retired to be a full-time mother. She has been nominated for several Daytime Emmy Awards. In 1993, Curlee and her GL writing team won the Daytime Emmy for Outstanding Drama Series Writing Team.

Her last GL writing team consisted of Stephen Demorest, Lorraine Broderick, James E. Reilly, Nancy Williams Watt, Michael Conforti, Bill Elverman, James Harmon Brown and Barbara Esensten, Roger Newman, Trent Jones, N. Gail Lawrence, Pete T. Rich, Sally Mandel, Patrick Mulcahey, Dorothy Ann Purser, Peggy Schibi, Courtney Simon, and Wisner Washam

Positions held
Guiding Light 
 Co-head writer: 1990 – February 1992; December 15, 1992 - 1994
 Breakdown Writer: 1987 - 1990
 Script Writer: 1985 - 1990

ABC Daytime
Story Consultant: 1996 - 1998

Awards and nominations
Daytime Emmy Awards

WINS
(1986, 1990 & 1993; Best Writing; Guiding Light)

NOMINATIONS 
(1989 & 1992; Best Writing; Guiding Light)

Writers Guild of America Award

WINS
(1992 season; Guiding Light)

NOMINATIONS 
(1989 & 1995 seasons; Guiding Light)

Head writing tenure

References

External links

Year of birth missing (living people)
Living people
American soap opera writers
Daytime Emmy Award winners
Women soap opera writers
Writers Guild of America Award winners